Chabahar Free Trade–Industrial Zone (CFZ) is an Iranian free trade zone formed according to the law on the establishment and administration of free trade–industrial zones .

Chabahar free trade–industrial zone was established in 1992 along with the two other free trade zones Qeshm and Kish Island to use global expertise (mostly from South East Asia) as a tool for the development of the country, accelerating the accomplishment of infrastructure, creation of employment, and representation in global markets.

The Chabahar free trade–industrial zone achieved its importance mainly from its geographical location as the shortest and the most secure route connecting the Commonwealth of Independent States (CIS) as well as Afghanistan to warm waters and its proximity to one of the largest oil, gas and mineral resources of the world and as the only ocean port of the country.

Main activities
Chabahar free trade-industrial zone started its activities in 1995 focusing on five major areas: transit of merchandized goods, investment attraction and related services, tourism, construction & urban development and education under the administration of public controlled Chabahar free trade-industrial zone organization.

May 2016 agreements between Iran and India

After overseeing a series of agreements intending to develop the Port of Chabahar, India's Highways and Shipping Minister, Nitin Gadkari suggested that the Chabahar Free Trade-Industrial Zone had the potential to attract upwards of $15 billion worth of investment in the future, although he stated that such investments are predicated upon Iran offering India natural gas at a rate of $1.50 per million British Thermal Units, which is substantially lower than the rate of $2.95 per million British Thermal Units offered by Iran. The two countries also signed a memorandum of understanding to explore the possibility of setting up an aluminum smelter at a cost of $2 billion, as well as establishing a urea processing facility in Chahbahar, although these investments are also contingent upon Iran supplying low-cost natural gas for operation of those facilities.

See also

International rankings of Iran

References

External links
 Iran Free Zones official website
 Chabahar Free Zone Organization official website

Further reading
 * 

Foreign trade of Iran
Special economic zones
Sistan and Baluchestan Province
1992 establishments in Iran